László Németh (born 11 February 1970) is a Hungarian weightlifter. He competed in the men's heavyweight II event at the 1992 Summer Olympics.

References

External links
 

1970 births
Living people
Hungarian male weightlifters
Olympic weightlifters of Hungary
Weightlifters at the 1992 Summer Olympics
People from Nyíregyháza
Sportspeople from Szabolcs-Szatmár-Bereg County
20th-century Hungarian people